Carlos Lillo (born October 2, 1915, date of death unknown) was a Chilean boxer, who competed in the 1936 Summer Olympics.

In 1936, he was eliminated in the quarter-finals of the lightweight class, after losing his fight to the upcoming silver medalist Nikolai Stepulov. Due to a scoring miscalculation, Thomas Hamilton-Brown was eliminated until the error was discovered several days later.

References

External links
Carlos Lillo's profile at Sports Reference.com

1915 births
Year of death missing
Lightweight boxers
Olympic boxers of Chile
Boxers at the 1936 Summer Olympics
Chilean male boxers
20th-century Chilean people